Bors is the name of two knights from Arthurian legend.

Bors may also refer to:
 Bors, Canton of Charente-Sud, France, a commune
 Bors, Canton of Tude-et-Lavalette, France, a commune
 Bors, Iran, a village
 Bors, the title character of Philip K. Dick's short story "The Last of the Masters"

See also 
 Borş (disambiguation)